Magik Three: Far From Earth is the third album in the Magik series by well-known trance DJ and producer Tiësto. As with the rest of the Magik series, the album is a live turntable mix.

Track listing
 DJ Tiësto – "Theme from Norefjell" [Magikal Remake] – 6:29
 Maracca – "Invocation" – 3:14
 Dove Beat – "La Paloma" [Ocean Remix] – 2:26
 Chicane – "Lost You Somewhere" [Heliotropic Mix] – 5:06
 Alex Whitcombe and Big C – "Ice Rain" [Solid Sleep's Cyper Rain Mix] – 5:31
 Ayla – "Ayla" [Original DJ Taucher Mix] – 6:29
 Hidden Sound System – "I Know" – 6:10
 Hammock Brothers – "Sea" – 4:47
 Dominion – "Lost Without You" [Zanzibar's Main Room Mix] – 5:27
 Allure – "Cruising" – 3:26
 Art of Trance – "Madagascar" [Cygnus X Remix] – 4:12
 Tekara – "Breathe In You" [Tekara's M&M Dub] – 5:00
 Classified Project – "Resurrection" – 3:30
 Scoop – "Wings Of Love" – 3:23
 Gouryella – "Gouryella" [Magik Version] – 3:23
 Pob – "The Awakening" [Quietman Remix] – 4:51

Tiësto compilation albums
1998 compilation albums
Black Hole Recordings albums